Sand Point, Nova Scotia may refer to one of two places:
Sand Point, Colchester County
Sand Point, Guysborough County